Thoroughfare is an unincorporated community in western Prince William County, Virginia.  Roughly located on Virginia State Route 55 about 1.5 miles West of Haymarket where the Norfolk Southern Railway tracks cross the road. The community thrived through the 1940s as a community founded by former slaves. As a place name, Thoroughfare is no longer in common use.

External links 
Free People Of Color At Thoroughfare

Unincorporated communities in Prince William County, Virginia
Washington metropolitan area
Unincorporated communities in Virginia